Demita Vega de Lille (born 21 July 1983 in Mérida, Yucatán) is a Mexican windsurfer, who specialized in Neil Pryde RS:X class. She represented her nation Mexico at the 2008 Summer Olympics, and later picked up a silver medal in windsurfing at the 2011 Pan American Games in Guadalajara. As of September 2014, Vega is ranked seventh in the world for the sailboard class by the International Sailing Federation, following her successes at the North American and ISAF World Championships.

Vega qualified for the Mexican squad in the newly introduced RS:X class at the 2008 Summer Olympics in Beijing by placing second and receiving a berth from the World Championships in Auckland, New Zealand. She posted a net score of 190 points to claim a creditable 23rd spot in a fleet against 26 other windsurfers.

At the 2011 Pan American Games in Guadalajara, Vega sailed smoothly in all the races with a remarkable grade of 28 to settle only for the silver medal in the women's sailboard class, falling behind Brazil's Patrícia Freitas by a 16-point gap. She also sought to compete for the 2012 Summer Olympics in London, but failed to fulfill her requirements with the Mexican Sailing Federation with a prospect to grant a place for her in the same class.

Demita Vega won the Silver medal at the 2015 Toronto Panam and Parapan Am Games.

Two years later, at the 2014 ISAF Sailing World Championships in Santander, Spain, Vega picked up a twenty-fourth spot in the women's RS:X class, and is expected to compete for the Mexican sailing squad on her second Games in Rio de Janeiro.

Vega's also competed at the 2020 Summer Olympics.

Notes

References

External links
 
 
 
 
 

1983 births
Living people
Mexican windsurfers
Female windsurfers
Mexican female sailors (sport)
Olympic sailors of Mexico
Sailors at the 2008 Summer Olympics – RS:X
Sailors at the 2016 Summer Olympics – RS:X
Sailors at the 2020 Summer Olympics – RS:X
Pan American Games medalists in sailing
Pan American Games silver medalists for Argentina
Sailors at the 2011 Pan American Games
Sailors at the 2015 Pan American Games
Medalists at the 2011 Pan American Games
Medalists at the 2015 Pan American Games
Sportspeople from Mérida, Yucatán